Ian Clayton Mackenzie, CBE (13 January 190917 October 2009) was a British diplomat.

Biography

Born on 13 January 1909, Ian Mackenzie was educated at Bedford School and at King's College, Cambridge.  After joining the British Diplomatic Service he served in diplomatic postings in China, Belgian Congo, Chile, Norway, Venezuela and Sweden, before serving as British Ambassador to South Korea between 1967 and 1969.
Ian Mackenzie died on 17 October 2009.

References

1909 births
2009 deaths
British centenarians
Men centenarians
People educated at Bedford School
Alumni of King's College, Cambridge
Ambassadors of the United Kingdom to South Korea
Members of HM Diplomatic Service
20th-century British diplomats